Clematis tangutica, the golden clematis, is a species of flowering plant in the family Ranunculaceae. It is found from Central Asia through to most of China, and it has been introduced to western Canada, Czechia, Slovakia, Switzerland, and the South Island of New Zealand. Its cultivars 'Bill MacKenzie' and 'Lambton Park', both members of the Tangutica Group, have gained the Royal Horticultural Society's Award of Garden Merit.

Subtaxa
The following subtaxa are accepted:
Clematis tangutica subsp. mongolica Grey-Wilson
Clematis tangutica var. pubescens M.C.Chang & P.P.Ling

References

tangutica
Flora of Afghanistan
Flora of Central Asia
Flora of China
Flora of Mongolia
Flora of West Himalaya 
Plants described in 1989